A topsail is the second square sail up a mast in a sailboat.  Topsail may also refer to:

In geography

Canada
 Topsail, Newfoundland and Labrador, a community in Conception Bay South, Newfoundland and Labrador, Canada
 Topsail (electoral district), a provincial electoral district in Newfoundland and Labrador

United States
 Topsail Island, one of the barrier islands on the southern coast of North Carolina, USA
 Topsail Beach, North Carolina, a community on the southern part of Topsail Island
 North Topsail Beach, North Carolina, a community on the northern part of Topsail Island

In other uses
 Topsail, a software project originating with U.S. Department of Defense's Information Awareness Office and later moved for further development with the National Security Agency